Moskvino is a rural locality (a village) in Yukseyevskoye Rural Settlement, Kochyovsky District, Perm Krai, Russia. The population was 75 as of 2010. There are 3 streets.

Geography 
Moskvino is located 28 km north of Kochyovo (the district's administrative centre) by road. Sizovo is the nearest rural locality.

References 

Rural localities in Kochyovsky District